Search are a rock band formed in Johor Bahru, Malaysia, in 1977 by drummer Yazit, lead guitarist Hillary Ang, bassist Nasir, rhythm guitarist Nordin and singer Amy. Their debut album was produced by Polygram Records (Singapore). The group have gone through many line-up changes in their career, but the songs and music have remained strong and unique among Malaysian, Singaporean and Indonesian fans. To date, they've released eleven studio albums, number of lives, compilation and joint (with Wings) albums. They've been regarded by Malaysian rock fans as the greatest rock band in Malaysia with their numerous hits along with rock anthems.

Band members 

The Search lineup (Founder Line up)
 Amy Search – vocals (1977–present)
 Hillary Ang – lead guitar (1981-present)
 Man Kidal – rhythm guitar (1985–present)
 Nasir Daud – bass (1981–present)

Kid & Din lineup
 Denden Gonjalez – vocals (2021–present)
 Nordin Mohd Taib – rhythm guitar (1984–1998, 2003–2006, 2008–present)
 Hamzah Mohd Taib – lead guitar (1988–1998, 2003–2006, 2009–present)
 Amran Marsiman – bass (1984–1985, 1990–1994, 2021–present)
 Minn - drums (2022-present)

Current touring musicians
 Awie – vocals (1997–1999, 2020–2021)
 Denden Gonjalez – vocals (2021–present)
 Pae – drums (2016–2021)
 Minn - drums (2022 - present) 

Former touring musicians
 Rafi – Rhythm guitar (1999–2001)

Past members
 Zainal Rampa – vocals (1977-1981)
 Moq – vocals (1999–2001)
 Shah Slam – lead guitar (1999–2000)
 Memek – bass (1977–1981)
 Fauzi – bass (1997–1998)
 Zam – bass (1999–2001)
 Yazit Ahmad – drums (1977–2001, 2005–2016; died 2019)
 Lola – drums (2003–2004)

Timeline

Discography

Studio albums & songs 

 Cinta Buatan Malaysia (1985)
 Langit Dan Bumi (1986)
 Mentari Merah Diufuk Timur (1987)
 Fenomena(1989)
 Karisma (1990)
 Rampage (1992)
 Gema Di Timur Jauh (1995)
 Rock 'N' Roll Pie (1996)
 Bikin Wilayah (1998)
 Selepas Banjir (1999)
 Gothik Malam Edan (2006)
 Katharsis (2017)

References

External links 
 Official Instagram
 Search rocks on! - New Straits Times.
 Koleksi Chord Lagu Kumpulan Search

Malaysian hard rock musical groups
Malaysian heavy metal musical groups
Musical groups established in 1981
EMI Records artists